Auburn Hospital is a 155-bed community hospital in Auburn, a western suburb of Sydney, New South Wales, Australia. It provides basic 24-hour emergency facilities, as well as a medical, surgical, paediatrics, and maternity facilities as well as coronary care and intensive care facilities.

This facility is part of the Western Sydney Local Health District (WSLHD).

Auburn Hospital is health facility on the eastern border of Sydney West Area Health Service.

Auburn Health claims to be an Australian Council of Health Care Standards (ACHS) accredited organisation.

As of 2010, Auburn Hospital is a teaching hospital for the University of Notre Dame Sydney School of Medicine.

History
Auburn Hospital was first opened as the "Granville Electorate Cottage Hospital" in November 1907.

References

External links
 

1907 establishments in Australia
Hospitals established in 1907
Hospitals in Sydney